Olga Valentinovna Korbut (born 16 May 1955) is a former gymnast who competed for the Soviet Union. Nicknamed the "Sparrow from Minsk", she won four gold medals and two silver medals at the Summer Olympic Games, in which she competed in 1972 and 1976 for the Soviet team, and was the inaugural inductee to the International Gymnastics Hall of Fame in 1988.

Korbut retired from gymnastics in 1977 at the age of 22, considered young for gymnasts of the period, but her influence and legacy in gymnastics was far reaching. Korbut's 1972 Olympic performances are widely credited as redefining gymnastics, changing the sport from emphasising ballet and elegance to acrobatics as well as changing gymnastics from a niche sport to one of the most popular sports in the world. She immigrated in 1991 to, and now lives in, the United States.

Early life
Korbut was born in Grodno to Valentin and Valentina Korbut. After World War II, the family moved to Grodno from Dubniaki (small town near Kalinkavichy). She started training at age 8, and entered a Belarusian sports school headed by coach Renald Knysh at age 9. There, Korbut's first trainer was Elena Volchetskaya, an Olympic gold medalist (1964), but she was moved to Knysh's group a year later. Initially he found her "lazy and capricious" but he also saw potential in her great talent, unusually supple spine, and charisma. With him, she learned a difficult backward somersault on the balance beam. She debuted this at a competition in the USSR in 1969. The same year, Korbut completed a backflip-to-catch on the uneven bars; this was the first backward release move ever performed by a woman on bars.

She finished fifth at her first competition in the 1969 USSR championships, where she was allowed to compete as a 14-year-old. The next year, she won a gold medal in the vault. Due to illness and injury, she was unable to compete in many of the competitions before the 1972 Summer Olympics.

Olympics

At the 1972 Summer Olympics in Munich, Korbut's acrobatics and open high-level gymnastics brought her much fame. To this day, the back tuck and Korbut flip are still very popular (2003 world beam champion Fan Ye performed both in her routine).

During the Olympics, Korbut was one of the favorites for the all-around after her dynamic performance in the team competition; however, she missed her mount on bars three times and the title went to teammate Ludmilla Tourischeva. That said, Korbut won three gold medals for the balance beam, floor exercise, and team competitions. In one of the most controversial finishes of all time, she took a silver medal in the uneven bars. Korbut's first attempt at her uneven bars routine was marred by several mistakes which all but ended her chances of winning a gold medal in the all-around. The next day, Korbut repeated the same routine in the event finals, although this time successfully. After the boards displayed a score of 9.8, the audience began to whistle and shout vulgar remarks at the judges in disapproval, believing her score to be too low. This carried on for several minutes but the judges refused to change their score.
 

Korbut is most famous for her uneven bars and balance beam routines, as well as her charismatic performances that captivated audiences. In 1973, she won the Russian and World Student (i.e., University) Games, and a silver medal in the all-around at the European Championships.

At the 1976 Summer Olympics in Montreal, Soviet coaches and officials had designated Korbut as the woman who could beat the Romanian prodigy, Nadia Comăneci, but Korbut was injured and her performances in the games were sub-par. She was overshadowed not only by Comăneci, but also by her own teammate Nellie Kim. She did collect a team gold medal, and an individual silver medal for the balance beam.

Retirement and life after the Olympics

Korbut graduated from the Grodno Pedagogical Institute in 1977, became a teacher, and retired from gymnastic competition thereafter. She married Leonid Bortkevich, who was a member of Belarusian folk band Pesniary. The couple had a son, Richard, born in 1979. In 1988 Korbut was the first gymnast to be inducted into the International Gymnastics Hall of Fame.

In 1991, she and her family immigrated to the United States, because they were worried about the effects of fallout from the Chernobyl disaster on Belarus. They settled in New Jersey, where she taught gymnastics. They moved to Georgia, USA two years later where she continued to coach. Korbut and Bortkevich divorced in 2000; she became a naturalized U.S. citizen the same year. In 2002 Korbut moved to Scottsdale, Arizona, to become head coach at Scottsdale Gymnastics and Cheerleading.  Korbut faced Darva Conger on an episode of Celebrity Boxing which aired on 22 May 2002. Conger won by unanimous decision. Korbut lives in Scottsdale, Arizona. She now works with private gymnastics pupils and does motivational speaking.

Korbut travelled to London for the 2012 Summer Olympics. She watched the gymnastics competitions in the North Greenwich Arena, providing commentary by way of Twitter and Facebook. During the Olympics the Royal Opera House hosted an exhibit it created with the Olympic Museum in Lausanne, Switzerland, titled The Olympic Journey, The Story of the Games. As well as historical artifacts, the exhibit featured the personal stories of 16 Olympic medallists, including Korbut. Korbut celebrated the 40th anniversary of her Olympic victories with an appearance at the exhibition on 3 August. She said "I didn't even expect this. I am so honored to be here."

In 2017, Korbut sold her 1972 and 1976 Olympic medals amongst 32 lots (including two golds and a silver from the Munich Olympics) which fetched $333,500 at Heritage Auctions.

In 1999, she spoke out about alleged sexual assault and rape she suffered at the hands of her coach, Renald Knysh, which he denied. Korbut stated, "The truth was that many of the gymnasts were not just sport machines but sexual slaves to their trainer. We were not just potential gymnasts but future concubines for himself." Later in 2018, Korbut appeared in a TV show in which she again spoke out about several incidents in which she alleged that her coach sexually assaulted her. As a result of Korbut speaking out publicly, several other gymnasts who had also trained under Knysh spoke of similar incidents to Korbut's allegations.

Legacy

Korbut, who has won four Olympic gold medals, is best known for her move, the Korbut flip, a backflip performed on the uneven parallel bars, starting from a standing position on the high bar and then catching the same bar from below on the under swing. She also achieved the flip on the 4" balance bar onto the straddle position and later the flip landing on her feet. Named after Korbut since she was the first to perform the skill at an international competition in 1972, the move has since been made illegal in the Olympic Code of Points.

After the 1972 Olympic competition, she also met United States President Richard Nixon at the White House. About the meeting, Korbut said: "He told me that my performance in Munich did more for reducing the political tension during the Cold War between our two countries than the embassies were able to do in five years." In addition to greatly publicizing gymnastics worldwide, she also contributed to a marked change in the tenor of the sport itself. Prior to 1972, the athletes were generally older and the focus was on elegance rather than acrobatics. In the decade after Korbut's Olympic debut, the emphasis was reversed.

Her 1972 Olympic achievement earned her the BBC Overseas Sports Personality of the Year and  ABC's Wide World of Sports title of Athlete of the Year. In a UK poll conducted by Channel 4 in 2002 the public voted "Olga Korbut charms the world" No.46 in the list of the 100 Greatest Sporting Moments. 

With their display of artistry and grace Korbut and Comăneci brought unprecedented popularity to the sport in the early to mid-1970s, attributes which are now seen as a lost art in gymnastics with athleticism taking precedence.

Eponymous skills
Vault: Handspring forward with a full twist onto the table with a full twist off, no saltos (4.0); and Handspring forward with a full twist onto the table with no twists or saltos off (3.60).
Uneven Bars: Arched layout backflip from standing on top of the high bar to regrasp the same bar; and Back Layout Dismount from standing on top of the high bar to past the low bar (both no longer in the Code of Points).
Balance Beam: Back handspring to swing down to cross straddle sit (B); Back Tuck Salto (C- although not named after her, first to perform it); and Front Tuck Salto Dismount (A- not named after her, first to perform).
Floor: Back Layout to Chest Position (A).

In popular culture
In a Peanuts comic strip published on 15 May 1973, the character Snoopy is seen doing balance beam positions with flawless precision on top of his doghouse for three panels until coming to a rest in the fourth one saying: "Olga Korbut has been bugging me for lessons!"

In X-Men #99 (June 1976), Nightcrawler makes a slight reference to Korbut's gymnastic skills in comparison to his own, to which Colossus, a fellow Soviet, admonishes him for it.

Competitive history

See also

List of people from Belarus
List of multiple Olympic gold medalists at a single Games
List of top Olympic gymnastics medalists
List of Olympic female gymnasts for the Soviet Union

Notes

References

Further reading

External links

Olga Korbut- Biography.com

Incredible Performance From Olga Korbut 'Darling Of Munich' – Munich 1972 Olympics – The Olympic Channel
Gymnast Olga Korbut charms the World – Faster, Higher, Stronger – BBC Two – BBC

1955 births
Living people
Sportspeople from Grodno
Soviet female artistic gymnasts
Belarusian female artistic gymnasts
Olympic gold medalists for the Soviet Union
Olympic silver medalists for the Soviet Union
Olympic gymnasts of the Soviet Union
Olympic medalists in gymnastics
Gymnasts at the 1972 Summer Olympics
Gymnasts at the 1976 Summer Olympics
Medalists at the 1972 Summer Olympics
Medalists at the 1976 Summer Olympics
Medalists at the World Artistic Gymnastics Championships
Originators of elements in artistic gymnastics
Belarusian emigrants to the United States
Universiade medalists in gymnastics
Naturalized citizens of the United States
BBC Sports Personality World Sport Star of the Year winners
Universiade gold medalists for the Soviet Union
Universiade bronze medalists for the Soviet Union
Medalists at the 1973 Summer Universiade